The men's sprint was held on 22 October 2011, with 24 riders participating.

Medalists

Results

Qualifying
The fastest 24 riders advanced to the 1/16 finals, the qualifying was held at 11:30.

1/16 finals
The winner of each heat qualified to the 1/8 finals, the races were held at 12:40.

1/8 finals
The winner of each heat qualified to the 1/4 finals, losers went to the repechage. The races were held at 13:52.

1/8 finals repechage
The losers of the 1/8 finals raced, winners advanced to the quarterfinals. Races were held at 14:28.

Quarterfinals
The races were held at 15:10 and 16:04.

Race for 5th–8th places
The race was held at 20:48.

Semifinals
The races were held at 19:36, 20:18 and 20:42.

Finals
The races were held at 21:04 and 21:19.

References

2011 European Track Championships
European Track Championships – Men's sprint